Monotagma is a genus of plant in family Marantaceae described as a genus in 1902. It is native to tropical America.

 Species

References

 
Zingiberales genera
Taxonomy articles created by Polbot